Nanilla is a genus of longhorn beetles of the subfamily Lamiinae, containing the following species:

 Nanilla delauneyi Fleutiaux & Sallé, 1889
 Nanilla globosa Zayas, 1975
 Nanilla terrestris Zayas, 1975
 Nanilla tuberculata Fisher, 1935

References

Parmenini